A window is an opening in a wall, door, roof, or vehicle that allows the exchange of light and may also allow the passage of sound and sometimes air. Modern windows are usually glazed or covered in some other transparent or translucent material, a sash set in a frame in the opening; the sash and frame are also referred to as a window. Many glazed windows may be opened, to allow ventilation, or closed, to exclude inclement weather. Windows may have a latch or similar mechanism to lock the window shut or to hold it open by various amounts.

In addition to this, many modern day windows may have a window screen or mesh, often made of aluminum or fibreglass, to keep bugs out when the window is opened.

Types include the eyebrow window, fixed windows, hexagonal windows, single-hung, and double-hung sash windows, horizontal sliding sash windows, casement windows, awning windows, hopper windows, tilt, and slide windows (often door-sized), tilt and turn windows, transom windows, sidelight windows, jalousie or louvered windows, clerestory windows, lancet windows, skylights, roof windows, roof lanterns, bay windows, oriel windows, thermal, or Diocletian, windows, picture windows, Rose windows, emergency exit windows, stained glass windows, French windows, panel windows, double/triple-paned windows, and witch windows.

The Romans were the first known to use glass for windows, a technology likely first produced in Roman Egypt, in Alexandria  AD. Presentations of windows can be seen in ancient Egyptian wall art and sculptures from Assyria. Paper windows were economical and widely used in ancient China, Korea, and Japan. In England, glass became common in the windows of ordinary homes only in the early 17th century whereas windows made up of panes of flattened animal horn were used as early as the 14th century. In the 19th century American west, greased paper windows came to be used by itinerant groups. Modern-style floor-to-ceiling windows became possible only after the industrial plate glass making processes were fully perfected.

Etymology 
The English language-word window originates from the Old Norse , from  'wind' and  'eye'. In Swedish, the word  remains as a term for a hole through the roof of a hut, and in the Danish language  and Norwegian  , the direct link to eye is lost, just as for window. The Danish (but not the ) word is pronounced fairly similarly to window.

Window is first recorded in the early 13th century, and originally referred to an unglazed hole in a roof. Window replaced the Old English , which literally means 'eye-hole', and  'eye-door'. Many Germanic languages, however, adopted the Latin word  to describe a window with glass, such as standard Swedish , or German . The use of window in English is probably because of the Scandinavian influence on the English language by means of loanwords during the Viking Age. In English, the word fenester was used as a parallel until the mid-18th century. Fenestration is still used to describe the arrangement of windows within a façade, as well as defenestration, meaning 'to throw out of a window'.

History

Technologies 
In the 13th century BC, the earliest windows were unglazed openings in a roof to admit light during the day. Later, windows were covered with animal hide, cloth, or wood.  Shutters that could be opened and closed came next. Over time, windows were built that both protected the inhabitants from the elements and transmitted light, using multiple small pieces of translucent material, such as flattened pieces of translucent animal horn, thin slices of marble (such as fengite), or pieces of glass, set in frameworks of wood, iron or lead. In the Far East, paper was used to fill windows.
The Romans were the first known users of glass for windows, exploiting a technology likely first developed in Roman Egypt. Specifically, in Alexandria  100 AD, cast-glass windows, albeit with poor optical properties, began to appear, but these were small thick productions, little more than blown-glass jars (cylindrical shapes) flattened out into sheets with circular striation patterns throughout. It would be over a millennium before window glass became transparent enough to see through clearly, as we expect now. In 1154, Al-Idrisi described glass windows as a feature of the palace belonging to the king of the Ghana Empire.

Over the centuries techniques were developed to shear through one side of a blown glass cylinder and produce thinner rectangular window panes from the same amount of glass material. This gave rise to tall narrow windows, usually separated by a vertical support called a mullion. Mullioned glass windows were the windows of choice among the European well-to-do, whereas paper windows were economical and widely used in ancient China, Korea, and Japan. In England, glass became common in the windows of ordinary homes only in the early-17th century, whereas windows made up of panes of flattened animal horn were used as early as the 14th century.

Modern-style floor-to-ceiling windows became possible only after the industrial  plate glass-making processes were perfected. Modern windows are usually filled using glass, although a few are transparent plastic.

Fashions and trends 

The introduction of lancet windows into Western European church architecture from the 12th century CE built on a tradition of arched windows
inserted between columns,
and led not only to tracery and elaborate  stained-glass windows but also to a long-standing motif of pointed or rounded window-shapes in ecclesiastical buildings, still seen in many churches today.

Peter Smith discusses overall trends in early-modern rural Welsh window architecture:
Up to about 1680 windows tended to be horizontal in proportion, a shape suitable for lighting the low-ceilinged rooms that had resulted from the insertion of the upper floor into the hall-house. After that date vertically proportioned windows came into fashion, partly at least as a response to the Renaissance taste for the high ceiling. Since 1914 the wheel has come full circle and a horizontally proportioned window is again favoured.

The spread of plate-glass technology made possible the introduction of picture windows (in Levittown, Pennsylvania,
founded 1951-1952).

Gallery

Types

Cross 
A cross-window is a rectangular window usually divided into four lights by a mullion and transom that form a Latin cross.

Eyebrow 
The term eyebrow window is used in two ways: a curved top window in a wall or an eyebrow dormer; and a row of small windows usually under the front eaves such as the James-Lorah House in Pennsylvania.

Fixed 
A fixed window is a window that cannot be opened, whose function is limited to allowing light to enter (unlike an unfixed window, which can open and close). Clerestory windows in church architecture are often fixed. Transom windows may be fixed or operable. This type of window is used in situations where light or vision alone is needed as no ventilation is possible in such windows without the use of trickle vents or overglass vents.

Single-hung sash 
A single-hung sash window is a window that has one sash that is movable (usually the bottom one) and the other fixed. This is the earlier form of sliding sash window and is also cheaper.

Double-hung sash 

A sash window is the traditional style of window in the United Kingdom, and many other places that were formerly colonized by the UK, with two parts (sashes) that overlap slightly and slide up and down inside the frame. The two parts are not necessarily the same size; where the upper sash is smaller (shorter) it is termed a cottage window. Currently, most new double-hung sash windows use spring balances to support the sashes, but traditionally, counterweights held in boxes on either side of the window were used. These were and are attached to the sashes using pulleys of either braided cord or, later, purpose-made chain. Three types of spring balances are called a tape or clock spring balance; channel or block-and-tackle balance, and a spiral or tube balance.

Double-hung sash windows were traditionally often fitted with shutters. Sash windows can be fitted with simplex hinges that let the window be locked into hinges on one side, while the rope on the other side is detached—so the window can be opened for fire escape or cleaning.

Foldup 

A foldup has two equal sashes similar to a standard double-hung but folds upward allowing air to pass through nearly the full-frame opening. The window is balanced using either springs or counterbalances, similar to a double-hung. The sashes can be either offset to simulate a double-hung, or in-line. The inline versions can be made to fold inward or outward. The inward swinging foldup windows can have fixed screens, while the outward swinging ones require movable screens. The windows are typically used for screen rooms, kitchen pass-throughs, or egress.

Horizontal sliding sash 
A horizontal sliding sash window has two or more sashes that overlap slightly but slide horizontally within the frame. In the UK, these are sometimes called Yorkshire sash windows, presumably because of their traditional use in that county.

Casement 

A casement window is a window with a hinged sash that swings in or out like a door comprising either a side-hung, top-hung (also called "awning window"; see below), or occasionally bottom-hung sash or a combination of these types, sometimes with fixed panels on one or more sides of the sash. In the US, these are usually opened using a crank, but in parts of Europe, they tend to use projection friction stays and espagnolette locking. Formerly, plain hinges were used with a casement stay. Handing applies to casement windows to determine direction of swing; a casement window may be left-handed, right-handed, or double. The casement window is the dominant type now found in modern buildings in the UK and many other parts of Europe.

Awning 

An awning window is a casement window that is hung horizontally, hinged on top, so that it swings outward like an awning. In addition to being used independently, they can be stacked, several in one opening, or combined with fixed glass. They are particularly useful for ventilation.

Hopper 
A hopper window is a bottom-pivoting casement window that opens by tilting vertically, typically to the inside, resembling a hopper chute.

Pivot 
A pivot window is a window hung on one hinge on each of two opposite sides which allows the window to revolve when opened. The hinges may be mounted top and bottom (Vertically Pivoted) or at each jamb (Horizontally Pivoted). The window will usually open initially to a restricted position for ventilation and, once released, fully reverse and lock again for safe cleaning from inside. Modern pivot hinges incorporate a friction device to hold the window open against its weight and may have restriction and reversed locking built-in. In the UK, where this type of window is most common, they were extensively installed in high-rise social housing.

Tilt and slide 
A tilt and slide window is a window (more usually a door-sized window) where the sash tilts inwards at the top similar to a hopper window and then slides horizontally behind the fixed pane.

Tilt and turn 
A tilt and turn window can both tilt inwards at the top or open inwards from hinges at the side. This is the most common type of window in Germany, its country of origin. It is also widespread in many other European countries. In Europe, it is usual for these to be of the "turn first" type. i.e. when the handle is turned to 90 degrees the window opens in the side hung mode. With the handle turned to 180 degrees the window opens in bottom hung mode. Most usually in the UK the windows will be "tilt first" i.e. bottom hung at 90 degrees for ventilation and side hung at 180 degrees for cleaning the outer face of the glass from inside the building.

Transom 
A window above a door; in an exterior door the transom window is often fixed, in an interior door, it can open either by hinges at top or bottom, or rotate on hinges. It provided ventilation before forced air heating and cooling. A fan-shaped transom is known as a fanlight, especially in the British Isles.

Side light 
Windows beside a door or window are called side-, wing-, margen-lights, and flanking windows.

Jalousie window 

Also known as a louvered window, the jalousie window consists of parallel slats of glass or acrylic that open and close like a Venetian blind, usually using a crank or a lever. They are used extensively in tropical architecture. A jalousie door is a door with a jalousie window.

Clerestory 

A clerestory window is a window set in a roof structure or high in a wall, used for daylighting.

Skylight 

A skylight is a window built into a roof structure. This type of window allows for natural daylight and moonlight.

Roof 

A sloped window used for daylighting, built into a roof structure. It is one of the few windows that could be used as an exit. Larger roof windows meet building codes for emergency evacuation.

Roof lantern 

A roof lantern is a multi-paned glass structure, resembling a small building, built on a roof for day or moon light. Sometimes includes an additional clerestory. May also be called a cupola.

Bay 

A bay window is a multi-panel window, with at least three panels set at different angles to create a protrusion from the wall line.

Oriel 

This form of bay window most often appears in Tudor-style houses and monasteries. It projects from the wall and does not extend to the ground. Originally a form of porch, they are often supported by brackets or corbels.

Thermal 

Thermal, or Diocletian, windows are large semicircular windows (or niches) which are usually divided into three lights (window compartments) by two mullions. The central compartment is often wider than the two side lights on either side of it.

Picture 
A picture window is a large fixed window in a wall, typically without glazing bars, or glazed with only perfunctory glazing bars (muntins) near the edge of the window. Picture windows provide an unimpeded view, as if framing a picture.

Multi-lite 
A multi-lite window is a window glazed with small panes of glass separated by wooden or lead glazing bars, or muntins, arranged in a decorative glazing pattern often dictated by the building's architectural style. Due to the historic unavailability of large panes of glass, the multi-lit (or lattice window) was the most common window style until the beginning of the 20th century, and is still used in traditional architecture.

Emergency exit/egress 
An emergency exit window is a window big enough and low enough so that occupants can escape through the opening in an emergency, such as a fire. In many countries, exact specifications for emergency windows in bedrooms are given in many building codes. Specifications for such windows may also allow for the entrance of emergency rescuers. Vehicles, such as buses, aircraft, and trains frequently have emergency exit windows as well.

Stained glass 

A stained glass window is a window composed of pieces of colored glass, transparent, translucent or opaque, frequently portraying persons or scenes. Typically the glass in these windows is separated by lead glazing bars. Stained glass windows were popular in Victorian houses and some Wrightian houses, and are especially common in churches.

French 

A French door has two rows of upright rectangular glass panes (lights) extending its full length; and two of these doors on an exterior wall and without a mullion separating them, that open outward with opposing hinges to a terrace or porch, are referred to as a French window. Sometimes these are set in pairs or multiples thereof along the exterior wall of a very large room, but often, one French window is placed centrally in a typically sized room, perhaps among other fixed windows flanking the feature. French windows are known as porte-fenêtre in France and portafinestra in Italy, and frequently are used in modern houses.

Double-paned 

Double-paned windows have two parallel panes (slabs of glass) with a separation of typically about 1 cm; this space is permanently sealed and filled at the time of manufacture with dry air or other dry nonreactive gas. Such windows provide a marked improvement in thermal insulation (and usually in acoustic insulation as well) and are resistant to fogging and frosting caused by temperature differential. They are widely used for residential and commercial construction in intemperate climates. In the UK, double-paned and triple-paned are referred to as double-glazing and triple-glazing. Triple-paned windows are now a common type of glazing in central to northern Europe. Quadruple glazing is now being introduced in Scandinavia.

Hexagonal window 

A hexagonal window is a hexagon-shaped window, resembling a bee cell or crystal lattice of graphite. The window can be vertically or horizontally oriented, openable or dead. It can also be regular or elongately-shaped and can have a separator (mullion). Typically, the cellular window is used for an attic or as a decorative feature, but it can also be a major architectural element to provide the natural lighting inside buildings.

Guillotine window 
A guillotine window is a window that opens vertically. The guillotine windows are opening from bottom to top or from top to bottom with more than one sliding frames. The remote control can be used to open and close guillotine windows.

Terms 
EN 12519 is the European standard that describes windows terms officially used in EU Member States.
The main terms are:

 Light, or Lite, is the area between the outer parts of a window (transom, sill and jambs), usually filled with a glass pane. Multiple panes are divided by mullions when load-bearing, muntins when not.
 Lattice light is a compound window pane madeup of small pieces of glass held together in a lattice.
 Fixed window is a unit of one non-moving lite. The terms single-light, double-light, etc., refer to the number of these glass panes in a window.
 Sash unit is a window consisting of at least one sliding glass component, typically composed of two lites (known as a double-light).
 Replacement window in the United States means a framed window designed to slip inside the original window frame from the inside after the old sashes are removed. In Europe, it usually means a complete window including a replacement outer frame.
 New construction window, in the US, means a window with a nailing fin that is inserted into a rough opening from the outside before applying siding and inside trim. A nailing fin is a projection on the outer frame of the window in the same plane as the glazing, which overlaps the prepared opening, and can thus be 'nailed' into place.

In the UK and mainland Europe, windows in new-build houses are usually fixed with long screws into expanding plastic plugs in the brickwork. A gap of up to 13 mm is left around all four sides, and filled with expanding polyurethane foam. This makes the window fixing weatherproof but allows for expansion due to heat.
 Lintel is a beam over the top of a window, also known as a transom.
 Window sill is the bottom piece in a window frame. Window sills slant outward to drain water away from the inside of the building.
 Secondary glazing is an additional frame applied to the inside of an existing frame, usually used on protected or listed buildings to achieve higher levels of thermal and sound insulation without compromising the look of the building
 Decorative millwork is the moulding, cornices and lintels often decorating the surrounding edges of the window.

Labeling 
The United States NFRC Window Label lists the following terms:
 Thermal transmittance (U-factor), best values are around U-0.15 (equal to 0.8 W/m2/K)
 Solar heat gain coefficient (SHGC), ratio of solar heat (infrared) passing through the glass to incident solar heat
 Visible transmittance (VT), ratio of transmitted visible light divided by incident visible light
 Air leakage (AL), measured in cubic foot per minute per linear foot of crack between sash and frame
 Condensation resistance (CR), measured between 1 and 100 (the higher the number, the higher the resistance of the formation of condensation)

The European harmonised standard hEN 14351–1, which deals with doors and windows, defines 23 characteristics (divided into essential and non essential). Two other, preliminary European Norms that are under development deal with internal pedestrian doors (prEN 14351–2), smoke and fire resisting doors, and openable windows (prEN 16034).

Construction 

Windows can be a significant source of heat transfer. Therefore, insulated glazing units consist of two or more panes to reduce the transfer of heat.

Grids or muntins 

These are the pieces of framing that separate a larger window into smaller panes. In older windows, large panes of glass were quite expensive, so muntins let smaller panes fill a larger space. In modern windows, light-colored muntins still provide a useful function by reflecting some of the light going through the window, making the window itself a source of diffuse light (instead of just the surfaces and objects illuminated within the room). By increasing the indirect illumination of surfaces near the window, muntins tend to brighten the area immediately around a window and reduce the contrast of shadows within the room.

Frame and sash construction 

Frames and sashes can be made of the following materials:

Composites (also known as Hybrid Windows) are start since early 1998 and combine materials like aluminium + pvc or wood to obtain aesthetics of one material with the functional benefits of another.

A special class of PVC window frames, uPVC window frames, became widespread since the late 20th century, particularly in Europe: there were 83.5 million installed by 1998 with numbers still growing as of 2012.

Glazing and filling 

Low-emissivity coated panes reduce heat transfer by radiation, which, depending on which surface is coated, helps prevent heat loss (in cold climates) or heat gains (in warm climates).

High thermal resistance can be obtained by evacuating or filling the insulated glazing units with gases such as argon or krypton, which reduces conductive heat transfer due to their low thermal conductivity. Performance of such units depends on good window seals and meticulous frame construction to prevent entry of air and loss of efficiency.

Modern double-pane and triple-pane windows often include one or more low-e coatings to reduce the window's U-factor (its insulation value, specifically its rate of heat loss). In general, soft-coat low-e coatings tend to result in a lower solar heat gain coefficient (SHGC) than hard-coat low-e coatings.

Modern windows are usually glazed with one large sheet of glass per sash, while windows in the past were glazed with multiple panes separated by glazing bars, or muntins, due to the unavailability of large sheets of glass. Today, glazing bars tend to be decorative, separating windows into small panes of glass even though larger panes of glass are available, generally in a pattern dictated by the architectural style at use. Glazing bars are typically wooden, but occasionally lead glazing bars soldered in place are used for more intricate glazing patterns.

Other construction details 

Many windows have movable window coverings such as blinds or curtains to keep out light, provide additional insulation, or ensure privacy.
Windows allow natural light to enter, but too much can have negative effects such as glare and heat gain. Additionally, while windows let the user see outside, there must be a way to maintain privacy on in the inside. Window coverings are practical accommodations for these issues.

Impact of the sun

Sun incidence angle 

Historically, windows are designed with surfaces parallel to vertical building walls. Such a design allows considerable solar light and heat penetration due to the most commonly occurring incidence of sun angles. In passive solar building design, an extended eave is typically used to control the amount of solar light and heat entering the window(s).

An alternative method is to calculate an optimum window mounting angle that accounts for summer sun load minimization, with consideration of actual latitude of the building. This process has been implemented, for example, in the Dakin Building in Brisbane, California—in which most of the fenestration is designed to reflect summer heat load and help prevent summer interior over-illumination and glare, by canting windows to nearly a 45 degree angle.

Solar window 

Photovoltaic windows not only provide a clear view and illuminate rooms, but also convert sunlight to electricity for the building. In most cases, translucent photovoltaic cells are used.

Passive solar 

Passive solar windows allow light and solar energy into a building while minimizing air leakage and heat loss. Properly positioning these windows in relation to sun, wind, and landscape—while properly shading them to limit excess heat gain in summer and shoulder seasons, and providing thermal mass to absorb energy during the day and release it when temperatures cool at night—increases comfort and energy efficiency. Properly designed in climates with adequate solar gain, these can even be a building's primary heating system.

Coverings 

A window covering is a shade or screen that provides multiple functions. Some coverings, such as drapes and blinds provide occupants with privacy. Some window coverings control solar heat gain and glare. There are external shading devices and internal shading devices. Low-e window film is a low-cost alternative to window replacement to transform existing poorly-insulating windows into energy-efficient windows. For high-rise buildings, smart glass can provide an alternative.

See also 

Airflow window
Architectural glass
Demerara window
Display window
Fenestration testing laboratory
Fortochka
Glass mullion system
Greased paper window
Insulated glazing
Porthole
Rose window
Window tax
Window treatment
Witch window

References

External links 

 Roman Glass from Metropolitan Museum of Art

 
Architectural elements
Glass